Oblivious (rendered on screen as Obliviou$) is a hidden camera comedy game show based on the British format by Tiger Aspect Productions and Mast Media of the same name.

Gameplay
Host Regan Burns would take a camera crew with him and ask unsuspecting people trivia questions, while playing some sort of role. The person being asked the questions did not know they were on TV until after Burns finished asking the questions, but usually he would do one final bit in his role before revealing the truth. For every question the contestant got correct, they received $20 in cash. Five questions usually were asked per person, for a possible $100.

At the start of the show, and before and after commercial breaks, Burns would walk up next to someone on the street and ask a single question for $20, before saying "We'll be right back" or a similar phrase. On some occasions, this money was refused.

Once per episode, there was a speed round, where contestants could get $20 for every question they answered correctly within one minute. At the end, contestants got a chance at a $100 bonus question, with that amount in cash given to them if they got it right.

Once per episode, Burns would give the unsuspecting contestant a chance at up to $500 more (this was called the Lightning Round), if s/he would take on the role of quizmaster. He would walk them through it using a hidden camera and a headset microphone out of view, and for every question that the next contestant got right, the first player got $100. (The other player got $20 per correct answer regardless.)

Sometimes other actors pretend to win money with the contestant.

Disguises
These are some of the disguises played by the host:

Florist
Janitor
Artist
Tennis Instructor
Video store worker
Camera store worker
Travel agent
Hollywood agent
Clown
Gas station attendant
Spanish person that sung songs at Taco Bell
A man getting married at Taco Bell.
Bartender
Hospital patient
Boxing referee

References

External links

2000s American comedy game shows
2002 American television series debuts
2004 American television series endings
American hidden camera television series
Spike (TV network) original programming
Television series by Stone Stanley Entertainment